Núbio Flávio Martins de Souza (born 25 May 1992) is a Brazilian footballer who plays as a forward.

Club career
Born in Timóteo, Flávio is a graduate of the América Mineiro youth setup and joined Tupi Football Club in 2013. In the following year, he joined Icasa; ending the 2015 season as the top scorer of the Campeonato Cearense with 10 goals.

On 22 May 2015, Flávio moved to Atlético Paranaense but was loaned to Fortaleza Esporte Clube on 16 December for the 2016 season, without having made any single appearance for Atlético Paranaense.

On 14 September 2016, Flávio was loaned to Paraná Clube for the rest of the season On 17 September, he made his debut in a 2–0 defeat against Atlético Goianiense.

After a loan stint with Tigres do Brasil in 2017, Flávio moved to Georgian club FC Dila Gori in April.

References

External links

1992 births
Living people
Association football forwards
Brazilian footballers
Brazilian expatriate footballers
Associação Atlética Internacional (Bebedouro) players
Tupi Football Club players
Associação Desportiva Recreativa e Cultural Icasa players
Club Athletico Paranaense players
Fortaleza Esporte Clube players
Paraná Clube players
Esporte Clube Tigres do Brasil players
FC Dila Gori players
Villa Nova Atlético Clube players
Volta Redonda FC players
Tupynambás Futebol Clube players
ABC Futebol Clube players
Campeonato Brasileiro Série D players
Campeonato Brasileiro Série C players
Campeonato Brasileiro Série B players
Erovnuli Liga players
Brazilian expatriate sportspeople in Georgia (country)
Expatriate footballers in Georgia (country)